The 2013 Real Salt Lake season is the team's ninth year of existence. The team's first game is on March 3 at Buck Shaw Stadium.

Background

Overview

Preseason

Desert Diamond Cup

Standings

Matches

MLS regular season

Standings

Western Conference

Overall table 
Note: the table below has no impact on playoff qualification and is used solely for determining host of the MLS Cup, certain CCL spots, and 2014 MLS draft. The conference tables are the sole determinant for teams qualifying to the playoffs

Results summary

Results by round

Match results

MLS Cup Playoffs

Bracket

Results

Conference semifinals

Real Salt Lake won 2–1 on aggregate

Conference finals

Real Salt Lake won 5–2 on aggregate

MLS Cup Final

U.S. Open Cup

Kickoff times are in MDT

Club

Roster

Transfers

In

Out

Coaching and technical staff

Kits

Statistics

Appearances and goals

Top scorers

Disciplinary record

Recognition and awards

Individual awards

Weekly awards

Annual awards

Team awards

Annual awards

References

Real Salt Lake
Real Salt Lake seasons
Real Salt Lake